Armenia selected its entry for the Junior Eurovision Song Contest 2011 through a televised national final, held on 17 September 2011, organised by the Armenian national broadcaster Public Television of Armenia (ARMTV). The entry selected was Dalita with the song "Welcome To Armenia".

Before Junior Eurovision

National final 
A submission period for artists was held from 21 June 2011 until 20 August 2011. The broadcaster received 135 submissions, and the twelve finalists were revealed on 10 September 2011, with the running order draw taking place on the same day at the Dolphinarium in Yerevan.

Final 
The final took place on 17 September 2011.  The winner was decided through a combination of SMS voting (50%), and an "expert" jury (50%).

At Eurovision

Voting

Notes

References

External links
 AMRTV website

Junior Eurovision Song Contest
Armenia
2011